Hyalite Reservoir is a reservoir located in southwest Montana, formed by Middle Creek Dam on Hyalite Creek. It was originally built in the 1940s and was expanded to its current size in 1993. Originally known as Middle Creek Reservoir, the name was changed in the late 1960s.

Geography
The lake sits at the northern end of the Gallatin Range, just south of the Gallatin Valley.

Recreation
Hyalite Reservoir and the surrounding area offer many recreational activities including camping, fishing, boating, and hiking. There are two campgrounds, Chisolm and Hood Creek. Motorized boating is allowed on Hyalite Reservoir with a "no wake" rule for the entire reservoir.

References

Reservoirs in Montana
Bodies of water of Gallatin County, Montana